Steve Corodemus (born January 14, 1952) is an American Republican Party politician, who served in the New Jersey General Assembly from 1992 to 2008, where he represented the 11th Legislative District.

Early life and education
Born in Newark, New Jersey, Corodemus was raised in Old Bridge Township, New Jersey, graduating from Madison Township High School in 1970.

Corodemus received a B.A. from Rutgers University in History in 1974 and was awarded a J.D. from the Seton Hall University School of Law in 1979.

Elected office
He was the Deputy Republican Leader and the Policy Chair from 2004 until he left the Assembly, was the Majority Whip from 1994 to 1995 and was the Assistant Majority Whip from 1992 to 1993. Corodemus served in the Assembly on the Health and Senior Services Committee and the Joint Legislative Committee on Ethical Standards.

Corodemus served on the Monmouth County Planning Board from 1986 to 1992, and as its Vice Chair from 1989 to 1992. He was a member of the Atlantic Highlands Borough Council from 1986 to 1988 and served as its president in 1988. Corodemus served as attorney for the Atlantic Highlands Rent Control Board and Board of Adjustment.

Personal life
Corodemus currently has a wife; Michele, daughter; Katelynn and one son, Dimitrios. He resides in Atlantic Highlands.

District 11 
Each of the forty districts in the New Jersey Legislature has one representative in the New Jersey Senate and two members in the New Jersey General Assembly. The other representatives from the 11th Legislative District during his time in office were:
Assemblyman Sean T. Kean, and
Senator Joseph A. Palaia

References

External links
Assemblyman Corodemus's Legislative Website
Assembly Member Steven J. 'Steve' Corodemus, Project Vote Smart
New Jersey Voter Information Website 2003
New Jersey Legislature financial disclosure form for 2006 (PDF)
New Jersey Legislature financial disclosure form for 2005 (PDF)
New Jersey Legislature financial disclosure form for 2004 (PDF)

Living people
1952 births
New Jersey lawyers
Republican Party members of the New Jersey General Assembly
Old Bridge High School alumni
People from Atlantic Highlands, New Jersey
Politicians from Middlesex County, New Jersey
Politicians from Newark, New Jersey
Rutgers University alumni
Seton Hall University School of Law alumni
Lawyers from Newark, New Jersey
21st-century American politicians